Jacinto Zamora y del Rosario (August 14, 1835 – February 17, 1872) was a Filipino Catholic priest, part of the Gomburza, a trio of priests who were falsely accused of mutiny by the Spanish colonial authorities in the Philippines in the 19th century.

Early life
Born on August 14, 1835, to Venancio Zamora and Hilaria del Rosario, he began his early education in Pandacan and later at the Colegio de San Juan de Letran. He was classified as a Filipino mestizo under the Spanish caste system prevailing at that time. He later transferred to the University of Santo Tomas after finishing his Bachiller en Artes. Zamora graduated on March 16, 1858, with the degree of Bachelor of Canon and Civil Laws. He became a student preparing for the priesthood in the Seminary of Manila.

Pastoral life
After being ordained, Zamora handled parishes in Marikina, Pasig, and Batangas. He was also assigned to manage the Manila Cathedral on December 3, 1864.

Death

Zamora had a habit of playing cards after saying Mass. Once, he received an invitation stating that his friend had "Powder and Munitions"; in a gambler's language, "Powder and Munitions" meant that the player had much money to gamble with. This invitation fell into the hands of the Spaniards—and worse, it was on the night of the Cavite mutiny led by a Filipino soldier, Sgt. La Madrid. This invitation was used by the Spaniards as evidence against Jacinto Zamora. The court accused them of inciting the revolt, even though the evidence was not adequate. They were found guilty and sentenced to death by garrote. The execution was carried out on February 17, 1872, at Bagumbayan Field in Manila. It has been said by the witnesses that Zamora was disoriented during his last days. As a result, he did not give any last words.

In popular culture
 Portrayed by Bodie Cruz in the official music video of GMA Network's production of Lupang Hinirang in 2010.
 Portrayed by Dennis Marasigan in the 2014 film, Bonifacio: Ang Unang Pangulo.

See also
Gomburza
José Burgos
Mariano Gomez
Cavite mutiny

References

 Gomburza (link broken as of April 29, 2008)

1835 births
1872 deaths
People from Pandacan
Executed Filipino people
Colegio de San Juan de Letran alumni
19th-century Filipino Roman Catholic priests
People executed by ligature strangulation
19th-century executions by Spain
People of Spanish colonial Philippines
Filipino people of Spanish descent
University of Santo Tomas alumni
Burials at Paco Park
People executed for mutiny